The Beginning may refer to:

Film and television
 "The Beginning" (Eureka Seven)
 "The Beginning...", an episode of Gotham
 "The Beginning" (Red Dwarf)
 "The Beginning" (Samurai Jack)
 "The Beginning" (The X-Files)
 The Beginning (2007 film), a 2007 skateboarding film
 The Beginning (TV series), a Chinese TV drama series
 The Beginning (1970 film), a 1970 Soviet film
 Baahubali: The Beginning, a 2015 Indian film

Music

Albums
 The Beginning (The Black Eyed Peas album)
 The Beginning (Broiler album), Norwegian DJ and electronic music duo Broiler
 The Beginning (Brooklyn Bounce album), German dance band Brooklyn Bounce
 The Beginning (EP), a 2004 EP by The Features
 The Beginning (Jandek album), 1999
 The Beginning (JYJ album), South Korean pop group JYJ
 The Beginning (Kevin Borg album), Maltese pop singer Kevin Borg, 2009
 The Beginning (Mercyful Fate album), 1987 compilation
 The Beginning, a 1980 album by Midnight Star
 The Beginning (Miles Davis album)
 The Beginning (Trae album), American rapper Trae

Songs
 "The Beginning" (Billy Ray Cyrus song)
 "The Beginning", song by Alicia Keys from Here
 The Beginning (Little Mix song)
 "The Beginning" (One Ok Rock song)
 The Beginning (RuPaul Song)
 "The Beginning" (Seal song), a 1991 song by Seal
 "The Beginning", a song by As I Lay Dying from the album Frail Words Collapse

Other
 The Beginning (concerts), by The Black Eyed Peas
 The Beginning (novel), a 2001 novel in the Animorphs series
 The Beginning, a Beanie Baby bear produced after the 1999 Beanie Baby retirement vote

See also
 B The Beginning, a 2018 anime series
 Beginning (disambiguation)
 Begin (disambiguation)
 In the Beginning (disambiguation)